Jorge Haddock Acevedo (born 15 August 1955) is a Puerto Rican engineer and academic administrator serving as the president of the University of Puerto Rico (UPR). On  July 7, 2021, the Governing Board of the UPR  unanimously requested his resignation and his term  ended on July 31, 2021 .

Early life and education 
Jorge Haddock Acevedo was born to his father of the same name and Francisca Acevedo, in Caguas, Puerto Rico on 15 August 1955. Haddock has two siblings, one of which is the actress Gilda Haddock. His mother, who held a master's degree, later divorced and raised her three children as a single mother with help of her father, Pedro "Don Peyo" Acevedo. Haddock's maternal grandfather, to whom Haddock later dedicated his doctoral thesis, was a waiter who had been able to send Francisca and her two brothers to college, one of whom became an accountant and the other an engineer. In 2019 Haddock was a guest to one of Gilda's daughter's wedding. On 7 June 1980 he married María de los Ángeles Valentín Díaz. They have two children, Angelique and Alexander, and four grandchildren: Desmond, Cameron, Lily and Noah.

Haddock earned a Bachelors of Science in Civil Engineering from the University of Puerto Rico - Mayaguez in May 1978 There he received a full-ride scholarship, without which, Haddock claimed, he would not have been able to attend. The following May he obtained a master's degree in Management Engineering from the Rensselaer Polytechnic Institute, followed by a PhD in Industrial Engineering from Purdue University in 1981 while simultaneously being an industrial engineering assistant professor in his baccalaureate alma mater.

Early career
He is a co-inventor of patent WO1997003409A1 filed under the title "Method and system for providing credit support to parties associated with derivative and other financial transactions." Additionally, he has authored over a hundred publications.

Between 1985 and 1986 Haddock was the advisor to the student chapter of the Institute of Industrial Engineers at Clemson University.

In 1999 he became a professor at the Lally School of Management and Technology, and later, in 2004, its dean. The next year Haddock was named dean of the Robins School of Business, of the University of Richmond, by then president William Cooper.

He is the author of the book Creating Global Business Leaders: Business Education at the Intersection of Innovation, Technology, and Globalization.

In 2009 he was appointed as dean of the then George Mason University School of Management. During his tenure there Haddock was invited to speak to the Rotary Club of Tysons Corner, and was named to the Association to Advance Collegiate School of Business, where he was part of the Initial Accreditation Committee between 2011 and 2014. When he became President of the University of Puerto Rico, he was invited to the aforementioned body's annual conference as a speaker on alternative revenue streams. Haddock was also appointed as mentor to the University of Bahrain's College of Business. Additionally, he was named chair of the Advisory Board to the Greater Washington Hispanic Chamber of Commerce in 2011.

In 2013 he aspired to two presidential positions. Haddock was one of five finalists for the position of University of Tennessee at Chattanooga Chancellor. Additionally, he was one of two finalist nominees for president of Fairleigh Dickinson University. In early 2014 Haddock was one of five nominees aspiring to the deanship of Daniels College of Business. Later that year he was named dean of the University of Massachusetts Boston's School of Management, where he also led its Entrepreneur Center as interim director and was chairperson to the Affirmative Action Advisory Committee.

President of the University of Puerto Rico 
Selection

In 2018 he was selected by the Board of Governors of the University of Puerto Rico to be Chancellor. His appointment, however, was not effective until 4 September, when he would be in Puerto Rico. On July 7, 2021 the Board of Governors requested his resignation.

When asked about his appointment, Haddock claimed that he would work "25 hours [a day], 8 days [a week]." His annual salary of $240,000,caused much controversy since the wage ceiling has been $105,000 since 1997. Additionally he was provided with a stipend ceiling of $5,000 for relocalization purposes. In a press conference after his appointment was announced, Haddock said "I have taken a substantial income hit. I do it because I did not come here for the money..."

On 4 September 2018, he assumed the role of president, upon which he said the budget cuts proposed by the Financial Oversight Management Board (FOMB) were "manageable", thought they would reduce the state's contributions to the university budget of $1,347 million (2018) by $243 million by 2023. The University has two simultaneous fiscal plans, one approved by the Board of Governors and the other by the FOMB. Haddock has claimed that the FOMB does not micromanage the university. When he received notification that the FOMB would require an additional $80 million as contributions to the pension plan, Haddock told Inside Higher Ed "We don’t have the money on top of the $86 million cuts -- now they want us to add another $80 million contribution. It's almost like they want to hurt us." Less than a month after taking office and having gone to each campus to better comprehend their problems, he had a meeting with the Executive Director of the FOMB, Natalie Jaresko, to "better explain to her the importance of full-ride scholarships, as well as the impact of the measures" expected by the FOMB. Since the FOMB had planned a yearly increase in cost-per-credit, Rock Solid Technologies doubled their  16 year old scholarship program to include four students in 2018, who had the opportunity to participate in a paid internship in the company. In the middle of the uncertainty of the time, Haddock recognized university achievements such as an Emmy-nominated documentary about Hurricane María made by University of Puerto Rico Arecibo students. In April 2019 the UPR Board of Governors acceded to a request from the FOMB to increase the cost-per-credit from $115 to $124 by July. The former was an increase as well from a long held cost of $57. Haddock opposed the gradual increase proposed by the FOMB which would raise the cost of tuition from $124 during the 2019-2021  academic year to $157 by the 2022–2023, as well as other cuts stipulated in their plan.

Budget cuts

Apart from the budget costs that the university faced, the matter of most importance to the university was the re-accreditation by the Middle States Commission on Higher Education (MSCHE), which had most campuses under probation. This had occurred since several financial audits had not been done for the past several years. Additionally it risked the potential closing of the whole university by 2021, in what is known as a teach-out plan. These allegations arose from the release, apparently against MSCHE policy, of the Río Piedras campus' show cause report, which included the teach-out plan. Haddock assured that the university would remain open and submission of teach-out plans are a routine part of the reaccreditation process. In order to turn in all documents on time, he ordered that no employee could go on winter recess until these had been satisfactorily submitted. In January 2019 he accused one of the largest unions for non-faculty staff, the Brotherhood of Exent Non-Faculty Employees (HEEND, in Spanish) for the delay of the 2018 financial statements. The HEEND claimed that those documents were the responsibility of Ernst & Young, as they were the external auditors. On three occasions the HEEND held protests blocking the entrance of non-faculty employees who worked on these statements to the university's central administration. On a fourth occasion, on 20 February, which Haddock called "irresponsible" and accused the HEEND of putting the accreditation at risk, employees were not able to access their workplace by car, but were permitted to do so as pedestrians. As a result Haddock docked the wages of employees who did not go to work. The university had to comply by submitting the 2017 documents by 15 January 2019 and the 2018 financial statements by March,though the latter was then extended until 30 April, however brought up a week earlier to the 21, as well as a report to the MSCHE by 25 January as to why accreditation should be granted to the university's eleven campuses. The university was able to turn in the 2016-2017 financial statements the night of 14 January, which was still 12 days after the deadline. In an interview upon announcing the completion and submission of the 2017 financial statements, Haddock claimed that the university had been late to turn documents of the same nature for the past eleven years. The Puerto Rican Association of University Professors (APPU, in Spanish) claimed that the loss of accreditation would have a domino effect on the educational system of Puerto Rico and that the university administration was "playing Russian roulette" with the issue of accreditation. The 2017-2018 financial statements were finally submitted on 29 April. At first glance, these revealed that the universe had $300 million in expenses over revenue. However, it turned out this was money owed to the retirement fund. The actuarial debt, the total amount it would take for the fund to pay all its responsibilities, amounted to $2,900 million for 2018, up from $2,010 million the year before. As such, Haddock assured that measures were taken so all required documents were turned in on time in posterity. On 6 June 2019, the FOMB released a new cuts upon those already implemented. The already executed cuts, Haddock claimed, showed that the UPR could survive "without laying off employees or closing campuses." The FOMB proposed "to freeze the defined benefit plan immediately and, to avoid its insolvency, that the UPR withdraw $160 million instead of the $80 million" that was originally projected. Haddock claimed this was "risky" since "it would leave the UPR without a rainy day fund.

Financial aid reforms

Haddock announced that a new financial aid model would be rolled out for the 2019–2020 academic year on 13 February 2019. The FOMB had ordered that all full-ride scholarships be eliminated, except for high academic achievers and veterans. In the 2018-2019 Academic year, the full-ride scholarships were reduced by 50%. The new model would not give out scholarships based on merit, but on economic necessities. However, it would keep the same requirements for except for the spouses of university employees. Haddock stated his support to then governor Ricardo Roselló Nevares' announcement in a state of the state address on 24 April 2019 in which Roselló proposed a free higher education model. He made it known that this would be through a massive open online course (MOOC), which had been already used by most private universities on Puerto Rico for online or degree courses online. This came just as it was revealed that less graduate students were admitted for the 2019–2020 academic year, being 495 admitted of the 3,049 who applied compared to the previous year's 1,139 of 3,568. This worried Haddock, however, it was more than the projected 3.3% reduction overall for total number of students in the university, which would be 53,203.

Haddock was successful in making an agreement with the Puerto Rico Federal Affairs Administration (PRFAA), where the university would have a representative in the agency. The representative would have to be an expert in federal grants and search for federal funding for the university. This position, as well as a $1 million in additional contracts and the buying of three new robes for the Board of Governors, received much criticism from the HEEND. Haddock stated that it was "incredible that the resource contracts that worked in the process for the University to meet the requirements of federal agencies and that helped us achieve the extension of accreditation" would be deemed "unnecessary," and that resistance to initiatives that would increase revenue and make university bureaucracy more efficient was "absurd." As to the acquisition of robes, Haddock clarified that this was necessary for the members to participate in graduations and official ceremonies as required by university protocol and policy.

It was under Haddock's administration, in March 2019, six months after he took office and eighteen since Hurricane María, that the university received the first round of funds to repair campus' facilities damaged by the hurricane. That same month, he initiated the search for rectors in propriety, since these had been interim since 2016. These are nominated by committees in their respective campuses, then by the president and approved by the Board of Governors. Later, in May, the Board approved 9 of the 11 nominated rectors, since Haddock had retired the nominations  from Cayey and Humacao.

In May 2019, Haddock order a stop to the eviction of Nelson Sambolín, a renowned artist who had his workshop at the university headquarters at the San Juan Botanical Garden. It was revealed that Sambolín had a contract with the UPR between 2015 and 31 June 2017, when his contract expired. However, the UPR continued making payments of $1,500 a month, without a contract, amounting to $10,500 by the time this was announced. Haddock claimed he was "proud" of Sambolin's work. Nonetheless, he was presented an eviction letter that stated he had to vacate the premises in 10 days time.

Investiture

His investiture ceremony, which took place at 9:00 a.m. on 13 June 2019 at the Río Piedras campus's theatre, was mired with controversy. The last presidential investiture to take place was for Ismael Almodóvar, who was president between 1977 and 1985. Even though they sent more than 500 invitations to universities outside of Puerto Rico, less than ten actually sent representatives. One ticket per person was offered to all employees and students who presented their official IDs at their respective campuses. Most of the audience was composed of deans of the university, some representatives of universities from the United States and presidents of the Evangelical Seminary of Puerto Rico, the Antillean Adventist University and the Universidad del Sagrado Corazón. Before the event, outside the venue accompanied by a group of protestors, the president of the HEEND, requested that the total cost of the ceremony be revealed, since it had been marketed as a "simple" event by the university and had a cost of $3,525 in academic dresses alone. During the ceremony, Haddock was handed a mallet used by the inaugural president, Jaime Benítez, as well as a medal. As the latter was being placed around his neck, a protestor displayed a banner which described Haddock as "insolent". The afternoon after the ceremony had finished it was revealed that the total estimated cost was $5,500, which was compared to the $40,000 it costs per graduation. Haddock was criticized for allegedly "feeding his ego" and the ceremony as a whole was labelled as "shameful".

In 2018 he inaugurated a Learning Commons Center at the University of Puerto Rico at Arecibo. In 2019 he was named Honorary Co-Chair of the Honorary Committee of the University of Albany's RISE 2019 conference. He has propelled the entrepreneurial and investigative development of the aeronautics and areospacial industries in Puerto Rico.

Possible closure of campuses

In October 2019, Haddock announced the possible closure of some campuses of the University due to proposed budget costs by the FOMB for the following fiscal and academic year. Allegedly, in a letter sent to the President of the Board of Governors in January 2020, he attempted to detain payments to employees of four campuses which had remained closed for two days during the preceding Fall Semester because of student protests against the budget costs.

Resignation 
On Wednesday, 7 July 2021, interim-Secretary of Education, Eliezer Ramos Parés as the ex-officio representative of the Department of Education in the UPR Governing Board, in an on-air interview with Jay Fonseca on the Telemundo program Día a Día, announced that the board would request Haddock's resignation. Ramos Parés confirmed that he favored the resignation and that this was due in part to accreditation problems at the Medical Sciences Campus [specifically its neurosurgery and radiological technology programs] and other faculties. Ramos Parés mentioned that "[the vote] is in favor of change and an orderly transition in that direction." Another source told Metro PR "that the petition would be unanimous," while another source stated that the electronic referendum was carried out the same day due to his imminent nature. On an initial occasion, the UPR press office stated that Haddock had not received an official notification from the Governing Board. During the development of the event, he was at an undergraduate graduation ceremony at the UPR at Utuado, and received news of the request extra-officially. Nevertheless, at 5:00 p.m., Haddock released a written statement stating he was surprised by the decision and claiming he had a 5 year contract. Haddock's presidency ended on July 31, 2021.

References 

Living people
Puerto Rican civil engineers
People from Caguas, Puerto Rico
1955 births
Purdue University College of Engineering alumni
University of Puerto Rico alumni
University of Puerto Rico at Mayagüez people
20th-century American engineers
21st-century American engineers
Presidents of the University of Puerto Rico